St. Vincent College of Education is a co-educational college of education in Yendi (Northern Zone, Ghana).  It is one of 46 public colleges of education in Ghana and participated in the DFID-funded T-TEL programme. Dr. Erasmus Norviewu-Mortty is the current principal.

The college is affiliated to the University for Development Studies, Ghana.

Education 
In the 2017/18 academic year, the college admitted 153 students.

History 
In 2016, St. Vincent ran a trial semester and signed a memorandum of understanding (MOU) with the University of Education, Winneba agreeing mentoring support from the university to the college.

References 

Christian universities and colleges in Ghana
2016 establishments in Ghana
Educational institutions established in 2016
Northern Region (Ghana)
Colleges of Education in Ghana